Bramiyeh is a  village in the Sidon District of the South Governorate in Lebanon.

History
In 1838, Eli Smith noted  it as el-Buramlyeh,   a village located in "Aklim et-Tuffah, adjacent to Seida".

In 1875 Victor Guérin traveled in the region, and noted about El-Bramieh: "I descend to the north through plantations of fig, pomegranate and lemon trees. [] I walk on a plateau whose soil is very fertile, and []  pass to El-Bramieh, a hamlet of about fifty inhabitants, Druses or Christians. There are some ancient tombs carved into the rock."

References

Bibliography

External links
Bramiyeh, Localiban 

Populated places in Sidon District
Druze communities in Lebanon
Christian communities in Lebanon